Big Brother All Stars is the all-stars format spin-off season of the Belgian version of Big Brother aired in the Flemish Region of Belgium on KanaalTwee.

The show started on 31 August 2003, with twelve past Housemates from the previous seasons, and finished on 20 September 2003 with a total duration of 21 days.
 
Although the All-Stars concept was applauded when revealed, this season's ratings dropped. Announced as "the battle of the best (housemates)", the viewers and critics missed a battle. Since there were no tasks but only challenges that didn't last long, most of the time the housemates were bored.

The missing of the most famous housemate of Big Brother Belgium Betty Owczarek was remarkable. The most controversial candidate, Dominique Cardon, was voted out during the launch night. The most rebellious housemate, Steven Spillebeen, made it obvious during the kick-off he felt obligated to participate (as the first Big Brother Belgium winner) but didn't want to be there. He asked to be and was voted out on Day 3. The winner was Heidi Zutterman of the third season who was named "Best Housemate". She didn't receive a money prize but a statue of a sword with the inscriptions of all stars and the inscription "Only can survive".

Immediately after the All-Stars season, the fourth regular season started.

Format
In the All-Stars season, the housemates weren't unknown people but past housemates from the past three seasons of Big Brother Belgium. Having four housemates of each season, including each winner and runner-up, the show was announced as a battle of the best. The housemates who participated were announced in a large campaign in which they were portrayed as fighters, ready to combat each other. 

This season followed the same concept as the regular seasons. Differences were that there were no tasks but challenges. Every housemate could ask for a challenge, challenging the reigning Big Boss. When defeating Big Boss, the challenging housemate became the new Big Boss. Big Boss was a new introduction in this series. The big advantage of Big Boss was being able to change the nominations: Big Boss could save one of the nominated housemates by changing that housemate for another.

Housemates

Daily summary

Nominations table

Notes
: For the first two rounds of Nominations, details are not known of who Nominated who.
: The Big Boss decided to leave the Nominations unchanged.
: Housemates were allowed to Nominate themselves this Week.

External links
 World of Big Brother

References

Big Brother (franchise)
2000 Belgian television series debuts
2000s Belgian television series
Belgian reality television series
Dutch-language television shows
VTM 2 original programming